Mesalina arnoldi is a species of sand-dwelling lizard in the family Lacertidae. The species is endemic to Yemen.

Etymology
The specific name, arnoldi, is in honor of British herpetologist E. Nicholas "Nick" Arnold.

Habitat

References

Further reading
Sindaco R, Simó-Riudalbas M, Sacchi R, Carranza S (2018). "Systematics of the Mesalina guttulata species complex (Squamata: Lacertidae) from Arabia with the description of two new species". Zootaxa 4429 (3): 513–547. (Mesalina arnoldi, new species).

arnoldi
Reptiles described in 2018
Taxa named by Roberto Sindaco
Taxa named by Marc Simo-Riudalbas
Taxa named by Roberto Sacchi
Taxa named by Salvador Carranza